Mohammad Qazi (born 23 April 1984) is a cricketer, born in Pakistan, who has played one Twenty20 International for Canada.

References

External links 
CricketArchive
Mohammad Qazi at ESPNcricinfo

1984 births
Living people
Canada Twenty20 International cricketers
Canadian cricketers
Qazi
Qazi
Canadian sportspeople of Pakistani descent